Parsvanath Jain Temple – II is located in Bhubaneswar.This temple is located in the Digambar Jain Temple precinct in Khandagiri. The temple is still used for worship. It faces towards the east. The cell measures 6.50 metres in length and 4.10 metres in width. The enshrined image in it is of Parsvanatha in a standing pose, crowned with a serpent hood. At the base two diminutive male images are on either side. The main image is flanked by four Jain meditators each with two images.

Age
Temple belongs to 20th century.

Significance
Associational significance: Bengal, Bihar and Orissa Digambara Jaina Tirthankara Committee.

Physical description
Surrounding: The temple is surrounded by Rushavanath temple in north at a distance of 9.00 metres, Parsvanath temple No-I in north-west at a distance of 3.30 metres, compound wall of the precinct in south. 
Orientation: The temple is facing towards east. 
Architectural features (Plan and Elevation): On plan, the Sanctum chamber measure 6.50 metres in length and 4.10 metres in breadth. The roof is a R.C.C. concrete slab.

Building material: Cement concrete and Brick masonry. 
Style: Kalingan

References 

Buildings and structures in Bhubaneswar
Jain temples in Odisha
20th-century establishments in India
20th-century Jain temples
20th-century architecture in India